Richard Wayne Estell (October 12, 1963 – February 15, 2022) was an American football wide receiver who played for the Kansas City Chiefs of the National Football League (NFL). He also played for Hamilton Tiger-Cats in the Canadian Football League (CFL) and New Orleans Night in Arena Football League (AFL). He attended J.C. Harmon High School and played college football at the University of Kansas.

Estell died on February 15, 2022, at the age of 58.

References 

1963 births
2022 deaths
American football wide receivers
Kansas Jayhawks football players
Kansas City Chiefs players
Hamilton Tiger-Cats players
New Orleans Night players
National Football League replacement players
Canadian football wide receivers